Metachanda fortunata is a moth species in the oecophorine tribe Metachandini. It was described by Edward Meyrick in 1911. Its type locality is Mahé Island, Seychelles. The species also occurs on the Silhouette, Curieuse and Félicité islands of Seychelles.

References

Oecophorinae
Moths described in 1911
Taxa named by Edward Meyrick
Moths of Seychelles